Silvia Tcherassi (born 21 August 1965) is a Miami-based, fashion designer, born in Barranquilla, Atlantico, Colombia.

Personal life and education
Silvia Tcherassi was born on August 21, 1965 in Barranquilla, Colombia. She started her artistic career as an interior designer and transitioned to fashion design.  Tcherassi  is married to Mauricio Espinosa and had two children, Sofia and Mauricio. Her daughter followed her mother steps and studies in Parsons School of Design. Her atelier is located in Miami, Florida.

Career

Tcherassi has been described as "revolutionizing the Latin American fashion scene in a definitive way." Elle has described her dresses as "tempting". She once said, "My creations are absolutely designed to serve a woman, from 18 to 50 years old." Silvia Tcherassi has boutiques in the United States, Spain and Colombia. Her clothes can be found at Saks Fifth Avenue and other fine stores. Her collections have been showcased on the catwalks of Milan Fashion Week and Paris Fashion week.

Her prêt-à-porter anticipated the concept of demi-couture. One of her pieces was included at the “Unbridaled: The Marriage of Tradition and Avant Garde” exhibition in Paris. She was named a chevalier (knight) of the French government's Ordre des Arts et des Lettres. Tcherassi is the author of the bestseller Elegancia Sin Esfuerzo (Effortless Elegance) published by Random House.

Tcherassi Hotels
She is also the founder and creative director of the brand extension Tcherassi Hotels focused in the creative development of hospitality and real estate projects.

References

Further reading

Tcherassi, Silvia (2009) Elegancia sin Esfuerzo.  Random House Mondadori.

External links
Official site

Colombian fashion designers
People from Barranquilla
Colombian people of Italian descent
Living people
1965 births
Colombian expatriates in the United States